A list of songs recorded by American rock band Creedence Clearwater Revival.

List

Notes

References

 
Creedence Clearwater Revival